Zbójna  is a village in Łomża County, Podlaskie Voivodeship, in north-eastern Poland. It is the seat of the gmina (administrative district) called Gmina Zbójna.

References

Villages in Łomża County
Łomża Governorate
Warsaw Voivodeship (1919–1939)